Kahlil Rafiq Carter, (born September 13, 1976) is a former professional gridiron football player who currently serves as the head coach of the Cologne Centurions of the European League of Football.

College football
From 1994 to 1997, Carter walked-on to the University of Arkansas' football team along with Brandon Burlsworth who inspired the movie Greater. He began his university career as a quarterback before making the transition to wide receiver. In 1998, Carter transferred to Southern Arkansas University where he led the Muleriders in special teams tackles.

Professional football career
Carter has been a professional gridiron football player in the Arena Football League, NFL, NFL Europe, and the Canadian Football League. His last season of professional football was spent playing defensive back in the AFL for the Iowa Barnstormers in 2010. Carter has also spent time in the NFL with Buffalo and NFL Europe with the Scottish Claymores. Carter also was a defensive back in the CFL with the Toronto Argonauts and the Montreal Alouettes.

2000 
Carter signed with the Arkansas Twisters of af2. He rotated between QB, WR, DB, LB and became the first player in team history to be signed to a professional contract (AFL). Completed 16–25 passes for 201 yards and 6 touchdowns while catching 10 passes for 165 yards and 5 touchdowns. Also recorded 25 tackles 2 ints, and 11 pbu's.

2001
Signed by the Milwaukee Mustangs (AFL). Played in all 14 regular season games with Milwaukee and recorded 35 catches for 364 yards and 6 touchdowns to go along with 24 tackles, two knockdowns, two interceptions, two fumble recoveries and one forced fumble on defense. Saw time at QB and completed four of four passes and two touchdowns. Named teams rookie of the year and a reserve on the AFL all-Rookie team.

2002
Acquired by the Toronto Phantoms (AFL) in the 2002 dispersal draft and recorded 17 total tackles, 1 fumble recovery, and two knockdowns, catching 10 passes for 119 yards and one touchdown.

2003
Attended training camp with the eventual ArenaBowl champions Tampa Bay Storm.  Signed with the Arkansas Twisters (af2) and set an af2 league record with 14 interceptions in 14 games (16 interceptions in 17 games including playoffs) and was named af2 Defensive Player of the Year.

2004
Signed with the Orlando Predators of the AFL to complement all-time great Kenny McEntyre.  Signed by the Buffalo Bills and allocated to the Scottish Claymores of NFL Europe. Led team in special team tackles. Recorded 28 tackles, 3 pass breakups, 2 force fumbles and 1 blocked field goal while captaining one of the stingiest secondaries in NFL Europe history. Attended training camp with the Buffalo Bills before sustaining season ending sports hernia.

2005
Acquired by Nashville Katz (AFL) in 2005 dispersement draft and recorded 70 tackles, 7 INT (second most in the AFL) and one forced fumble with Nashville. Named Second-Team All-Arena at corner and safety.

2006
Carter was a pre-season all-arena selection for the Nashville Katz of the AFL. Named AFL Defensive Player of the Week on February 28 after posting 11 tackles, 2 pass break-ups and an interception in Katz victory. Named Defensive Player of the Week in Conference Championship vs Dallas for recording 2 INT, one for a TD. He played in ArenaBowl XX where he recorded the longest touchdown run in ArenaBowl history (36 yards.) He joined the Toronto Argonauts (CFL) in week 2 and eventually played in 12 games, starting seven at DB and CB, also saw time at LB and on ST. Established career highs in defensive tackles, interceptions and interception return yards. Moved into a third place tie with LB Don Wilson on the Argos’ all-time single season interception yards list with 184. Placed tied for 3rd all-time on Argo's consecutive games with an interception list with 3. Week 7, recorded his first-ever CFL interception (03/08/06) and returned it 84-yards for a TD.

2007
Dressed for all 18 regular season games rotating in the Toronto Argonauts' secondary, starting 6 at DB and CB. Finished the season with 3 ints and two defensive touchdowns. Named player of the week on Sept 13 for a 7 tackle performance which included an 82-yard interception return for a touchdown against Hamilton.  Named to the af2 anniversary team and voted the #2 defensive specialist in af2 history.  Had his #9 jersey retired by the Arkansas Twisters of the af2.

2008
Carter attended training camp with the Kansas City Brigade (AFL) after being traded from the Orlando Predators (AFL) in exchange for DB Kenny McEntyre. He played in two preseason games and recorded interceptions in both before sustaining a season ending shoulder injury. 
Went to training camp with the Toronto Argonauts replacing Jordan Younger at boundary corner recording 3 tkls 1 pbu and 1 ints in preseason game versus Montreal. Signed by Orlando Predators of the AFL. Played in AFL playoff game on three days notice. Recorded 6 tkls 1 pass break up, 1 forced fumble, 1 interception despite loss. Signed by Montreal in July. Played in four regular season games recording 7 tkls, 2 ints 1 def. td (50 yds.) and 5 pass break ups. East Final versus Edmonton 5 tkls 4 pass break ups, 2008 Grey Cup game high 8 tkls, good for 3rd all time in Grey Cup history.

2010 
Carter served as player/coach and team captain for the Iowa Barnstormers of the new AFL. At age 34, Carter was one of only 3 players with AFL experience on a very young Barnstormer team.  Khalil appeared in all 16 games and finished with 85 tackles, 5 interceptions, 3 fumble recoveries, and 17 pass breakups.  Coach Carter, as he affectionately became known, captained the Barnstormers 3rd ranked scoring defense also finishing 1st against the run.  For the second season under coach Carter's watch, one of his players (Tanner Varner) broke the league tackling record with 146 tackles. Under Carter's watch Jason Simpson also broke the AF2 record in 2007 for the Arkansas Twisters with 145.  Both were rookies and recorded at least 8 interceptions as well.  After the season, Carter announced his retirement and was hired to coach the secondary at Graceland University in southern Iowa.

Coaching career
Carter began his coaching career as a player/coach in 2007 as Pass Game and Special Teams Coordinator for the Arkansas Twisters of the AF2 while still an active player in the CFL.

In 2010, he also served as a player/coach with the Iowa Barnstormers. As a defensive back and team captain, Carter assisted with their weekly game-plan preparation and their player personnel. Later in 2010, Carter took his first collegiate coaching position as a volunteer assistant and Secondary and  coach at Graceland University.

In the spring of 2011, Carter served as defensive coordinator for the Trenton Steel of the Southern Indoor Football League. Later that year, he coached cornerbacks at Valley High School in West Des Moines during its 2011 state 4A championship season.

In July 2012, Carter was named the cornerbacks coach for the Drake Bulldogs football team. In his first season on the staff, he helped coach a pass defense that ranked second in the Pioneer Football League by allowing just 185 passing yards per game. That year Drake won a share of the Pioneer Football League Conference Championship

In 2013, Carter helped coach the #1 ranked defense in the Pioneer Football League producing a 2nd team All Conference Corner, Brad Duwe

In 2014, Carter served as a guest coach for the Grey Cup champion, Saskatchewan Roughriders. Later that fall, Carter rejoined West Des Moines Valley High School, upset #1 ranked Dowling Catholic, and finished #1 in the state.

Also in 2014, Carter signed on to coach the secondary for the FXFL Blacktips of the newly formed FXFL which later became The Spring League.

From 2015 to 2017, Carter was named as the defensive backs coach for the Calgary Stampeders of the Canadian Football League. Calgary finished with the #1 s doing défense and pass defense all 3 seasons reaching back to back Grey Cups in 2016 and 2017.

On January 3, 2018, Carter was named the defensive coordinator for the Montreal Alouettes of the Canadian Football League, but on May 18, 2018, Carter resigned from the position for personal reasons, and was reassigned as a team scout.

Carter coached for Valley High School again in 2019 and 2020 reaching another State championship in 2019 with a perfect 13-0 record. The 2020 season was cut short due to COVID in the semi-finals of the playoffs.

On October 11, 2022, Carter was named as the head coach and defensive coordinator of the Cologne Centurions of the European League of Football. On March 17, 2023, Carter and the Centurions parted ways.

Personal life
Though born in Washington, D.C., Carter was raised in Little Rock, Arkansas, where he graduated from Little Rock Central High School. He graduated in 2000 from the University of Arkansas with a B.A. in Psychology and a minor in French. In August 2014, Carter graduated with Pi Alpha Alpha honors receiving a Master of Public Administration from Drake University in Des Moines, Iowa. Carter is one of the founding members of the ABH chapter of the Phi Beta Sigma fraternity, and has over  10 years experience in youth counseling and mentoring. Carter is married to his wife Courtney, and has 4 daughters, Briana, Brooklyn, Mya, and Belize.

References

External links
 Calgary Stampeders profile page
 Iowa Barnstormers profile
 Graceland University profile
Kahlil Carter on Twitter https://www.twitter.com/lcoachswaag

1976 births
African-American players of Canadian football
American football defensive backs
American football wide receivers
Arkansas Razorbacks football players
Arkansas Twisters players
Calgary Stampeders coaches
Canadian football defensive backs
Coaches of American football from Arkansas
Coaches of American football from Washington, D.C.
Drake Bulldogs football coaches
Drake University alumni
Graceland Yellowjackets football coaches
High school football coaches in Iowa
Iowa Barnstormers players
Kansas City Brigade players
Living people
Montreal Alouettes players
Milwaukee Mustangs (1994–2001) players
Nashville Kats players
Orlando Predators players
Players of American football from Arkansas
Players of American football from Des Moines, Iowa
Players of American football from Washington, D.C.
Saskatchewan Roughriders coaches
Scottish Claymores players
Sportspeople from Little Rock, Arkansas
Southern Arkansas Muleriders football players
Texas Revolution coaches
Toronto Argonauts players
Toronto Phantoms players
21st-century African-American sportspeople
20th-century African-American sportspeople